Mount Walla is a historic home located near Scottsville, Albemarle County, Virginia. It was built between 1820 and 1840, and is a 1 and 1/2-story, hall and parlor plan frame Federal-style dwelling. The house received a series of additions during the second half of the 20th century, more than doubling its size.  Also on the property is a contributing smokehouse. The property also includes a family cemetery with Victorian iron fence. In 1836, the property was purchased by Peter Field Jefferson, grandnephew of the president.

The property is located in the Scottsville Historic District, and was added to the National Register of Historic Places in 2000.

References

External links
 John Scott House, Jackson Street, Scottsville, Albemarle County, VA at the Historic American Buildings Survey (HABS)
 Capturing Our Heritage, Mount Walla entry with the Scottsville Museum

Houses on the National Register of Historic Places in Virginia
Federal architecture in Virginia
Houses completed in 1840
Houses in Albemarle County, Virginia
National Register of Historic Places in Albemarle County, Virginia
Historic American Buildings Survey in Virginia
Individually listed contributing properties to historic districts on the National Register in Virginia